Calytrix divergens is a species of plant in the myrtle family Myrtaceae that is endemic to Western Australia.

It blooms between May and October producing yellow star shaped flowers.

Found on breakaways and escarpments in the Mid West and the Goldfields-Esperance regions of Western Australia where it grows on sandy soils over laterite, quartzite or granite.

References

Plants described in 1987
divergens
Flora of Western Australia